Bertrand Yves Baraye (born 21 June 1992) is a Senegalese footballer who plays as an attacking midfielder, most recently for Serbian SuperLiga club Vojvodina.

Career
Baraye started his career at Marseille, and then moved onto Udinese. He never made an appearance for the first team, as he was moved out to Lumezzane in 2011. In 2013, Chievo bought him outright for €100,000 from Lumezzane, only to send him out to Juve Stabia in a co-ownership deal for €500,000 (exchanged with 50% registration rights of Luca Martinelli for an undisclosed fee) In January 2014 Chievo bought back Baraye for an undisclosed fee, with Martinelli moved to opposite direction for an undisclosed fee; Juve Stabia also signed Vincenzo Carrotta for €400,000 in the same window.

In summer 2014 Baraye moved to Torres in a temporary deal. In 2015, Chievo released him and he signed for the newly reformed Parma.

On 31 January 2019, he joined Padova on loan with an option to buy.

On 2 September 2019, he joined Portuguese club Gil Vicente on loan.

On 12 June 2022 Baraye signed a two year deal with Vojvodina.

References

External links

Living people
Footballers from Dakar
1992 births
Senegalese footballers
Association football midfielders
Association football forwards
F.C. Lumezzane V.G.Z. A.S.D. players
A.C. ChievoVerona players
S.S. Juve Stabia players
S.E.F. Torres 1903 players
Parma Calcio 1913 players
Calcio Padova players
Gil Vicente F.C. players
Serie B players
Serie C players
Primeira Liga players
Senegalese expatriate footballers
Senegalese expatriate sportspeople in Italy
Expatriate footballers in Italy
Senegalese expatriate sportspeople in Portugal
Expatriate footballers in Portugal